Charles Cave may refer to:
Sir Charles Cave, 1st Baronet (1832–1922), British banker
Sir Charles Cave, 2nd Baronet (1861–1932)
Sir Charles Cave, 4th Baronet (1927–1997)
Charles John Philip Cave (1871–1950), English meteorologist
Charles Cave, bassist of the British band White Lies

See also
Charles Philip Haddon-Cave (1925–1999), Financial Secretary, Chief Secretary and Administrator of Hong Kong
Cave (surname)